Hefner were a British indie rock band formed in east London in 1995. They were active from about 1996 until 2002; since then they have played together only once, for a tribute to the DJ John Peel, who was a strong supporter of theirs.

History
Hefner's roots stretch back to 1992, when Darren Hayman and Antony Harding met at art school in Kent. The band started playing live in 1995 and, after several line up changes, became a solo project of Darren Hayman. In 1996 he recorded a tape for Sticky Records (named The Devotion Chamber) on which all instruments were played by Hayman himself.  His friend from art school, Antony Harding, assisted, providing backing vocals.

The band's first release was in April 1997 when the 7-inch single "A Better Friend" was released by Boogle Wonderland. The single featured Harding on drums and John Morrison (from Rhatigan) on bass. Shortly after the release, the record label Too Pure offered a record deal to Darren, who extended the offer to Antony and John.

After a few more singles, Hefner recorded their debut album Breaking God's Heart, which was released in 1998. A lo fidelity album primarily recorded in one take, Hayman has declared that this album is the one he is least interested in listening to, due to its unrealized potential.

The Fidelity Wars would be their next record (with the recent addition of multi-instrumentalist Jack Hayter); a darker collection of songs. In the official website of the band Hayman has explained that all of the songs gravitate towards the concept of breaking up.

Hefner had, at this point, recorded a large number of singles and EPs.  Boxing Hefner collected some of those tracks that had not appeared on the previous albums, often as new recordings.  The compilation also included some unreleased material.

We Love the City marked a change in direction for the band. In contrast with previous records, which had older songs, all of the compositions on We Love the City were made for this record, which had better production value and more varied instrumentation.

Dead Media, released in 2001, continues the interest that Hefner had shown in exploring new ways.   Dead Media is certainly different from previous records in the sense of its electronic weight, an interest that led Darren to eventually create The French.

After the band's final gig at the ICA in London on 10 December 2001 and the release of an EP called The Hefner Brain the following March, the band went on a seemingly permanent hiatus, save for one reformation for the "Keeping It Peel" tribute show, marking the death of one of their biggest supporters, Radio 1 DJ John Peel. In 2005 a T-shirt was released that read "Hefner, Britain’s Largest Small Band (1997–2002)", and in an interview Darren Hayman said "no, no reunion planned".

Their song I Love Only You was featured on the 2015 Craig Cash sitcom After Hours.

Post-Hefner
In 2005, following a legal dispute between Darren Hayman and Too Pure, the rights to all of the band's Too Pure recordings were reverted to Hayman. As a result, the band has released a best-of album, a 2 CD collection of 43 unreleased songs called Catfight and a live album, recorded at the BBC's Maida Vale Studios. All of the band's studio albums have been reissued as 2-CD sets with bonus tracks.  Planned for the future is a compilation of BBC session tracks. The band recorded ten sessions for John Peel's BBC Radio One programme, as well as a number of live performances, and eleven of their tracks made it into the Festive 50.

Darren Hayman and Jack Hayter played Hefner songs at a number of dates in Europe in June 2008. Despite this, Hayman has said that Hefner will not reform unless it's with the original line up. He has consistently aired his disdain for bands that reform.

Band members
Darren Hayman (vocals, guitar, keyboards)
Antony Harding (drums, backing vocals)
John Morrison (bass guitar)
Jack Hayter (guitar, pedal steel guitar, keyboards, fiddle, vocals)

Spin offs and solo projects
Darren Hayman
The French
Hayman, Watkins, Trout & Lee
The Stereo Morphonium
Jack Hayter
ANT solo project of Antony Harding
Lonely Boy, featuring Antony Harding singing the poetry of Norwegian poet Eivind Kirkeby
Rhatigan
Darren Hayman & the Secondary Modern
Papernut Cambridge, featuring Darren Hayman and Jack Hayter

Discography

Studio albums
 Breaking God's Heart - Too Pure - 1998
 The Fidelity Wars - Too Pure - 1999 (#165)
 We Love the City - Too Pure - 2000 (#92)
 Dead Media - Too Pure - 2001 (#178)

Compilations and live albums
 Boxing Hefner - Too Pure - 2000 (#144)
 Kick, Snare, Hats, Ride - self-released - 2002
 The Best of Hefner - Fortune and Glory Records - 2006
 Catfight - self-released - 2006
 Maida Vale - Belka - 2006

EPs
 The Devotion Chamber - Sticky Records - 1996
 The Hefner Soul - Too Pure - 1998
 The Hefner Heart - Acuarela Discos - 1999
 Orphan Songs - Everlasting Records - 1999
 Revelations -  Too Pure - 1999
 The Hefner Brain - Too Pure - 2002 (#21 §)
§ - Budget Album Chart

Singles
 "A Better Friend" - Boogle Wonderland - 1997 (7-inch only)
 "Lee Remick" - Boogle Wonderland - 1998 (7-inch only)
 "Pull Yourself Together"  - Too Pure - 1998
 "Love Will Destroy Us in the End" - Too Pure - 1998
 "The Sweetness Lies Within" - Too Pure - 1998 (#171)
 "The Hymn for the Alcohol" - Sticky Records - 1999 (7-inch only)
 "The Hymn for the Cigarettes" - Too Pure - 1999 (#87)
 "I Took Her Love for Granted" - Too Pure - 1999 (#136)
 "Christian Girls" - Too Pure - 2000 (#76)
 "Good Fruit" - Too Pure - 2000 (UK No. 50)
 "The Greedy Ugly People" - Too Pure - 2000 (UK No. 64)
 "Half a Life" - Too Pure - 2001 (split 7-inch with Murry the Hump) (#152)
 "Alan Bean" - Too Pure - 2001 (UK No. 58)
 "Trouble Kid" - Too Pure - 2001

See also
Darren Hayman
Antony Harding
Jack Hayter
Rhatigan
Rotifer

References

External links
 – official site
 – official site

"the thing is..." magazine Darren Hayman interview
Concert photos by Laurent Orseau (Black Session)
Hefner interview (March 1999) for QRD
Hefner Interview (February 2000) for QRD
Darren Hayman interview (May 2008) for HDIF

English indie rock groups
Musical groups from London